The 1989 Central American and Caribbean Championships in Athletics were held at the Estadio Sixto Escobar in San Juan, Puerto Rico between 27–29 July.

Medal summary

Men's events

Women's events

Medal table

See also
1989 in athletics (track and field)

External links
Men Results – GBR Athletics
Women Results – GBR Athletics

Central American and Caribbean Championships in Athletics
Central American and Caribbean Championships
Sports in San Juan, Puerto Rico
Central American And Caribbean Championships In Athletics, 1989
International athletics competitions hosted by Puerto Rico
Athl
Athl